Nadia Petrova and Katarina Srebotnik were the defending champions, but Srebotnik chose to participate at the BGL Luxembourg Open instead.Petrova partnered up with Maria Kirilenko, and they won in the final 6–2, 6–2 against Maria Kondratieva and Klára Zakopalová.

Seeds

Draw

External links
 Main Draw

Kremlin Cup
Kremlin Cup